Lasnet Nkouka (born 28 January 1970) is a Congolese sprinter. She competed in the women's 400 metres at the 1988 Summer Olympics.

References

1970 births
Living people
Athletes (track and field) at the 1988 Summer Olympics
Republic of the Congo female sprinters
Olympic athletes of the Republic of the Congo
World Athletics Championships athletes for the Republic of the Congo
Place of birth missing (living people)
Olympic female sprinters